Melvin W. Perry (February 26, 1864 – February 18, 1951) was a member of the Wisconsin State Senate, serving the 1st Senate District.

Biography
Perry was born in Racine, Wisconsin. His parents at that time were residents of Algoma. He attended public school until age 14. He worked as a Carpenter and Millwright for many years before entering politics. He died in Delray Beach, Florida.

His former home, now known as the Melvin W. and Mary Perry House, is listed on the National Register of Historic Places.

Career
Perry was a member of the Senate from 1911 to 1918. Previously, he was mayor of Algoma in 1910. He was a Republican.

References

External links

Politicians from Racine, Wisconsin
People from Algoma, Wisconsin
Republican Party Wisconsin state senators
Mayors of places in Wisconsin
1864 births
1951 deaths